Tyler McNeely (born April 8, 1987) is a Canadian professional ice hockey player. He is currently playing for the Bietigheim Steelers in the German DEL2.

Playing career
Undrafted, McNeely played collegiate hockey with Northeastern University of the Hockey East. Upon completion of his collegiate career, on March 24, 2011, the Bridgeport Sound Tigers of the American Hockey League signed McNeely to an amateur tryout contract. After recording an impressive 5 goals and 11 points in 10 games with the Sound Tigers on April 20, 2011 he was signed as a free agent by the New York Islanders of the National Hockey League to a one-year, two-way, contract. He was reassigned to the Sound Tigers for the duration of the 2011–12 season, posting 21 points in 66 games.

Unsigned from the Islanders, McNeely signed an ECHL contract with the South Carolina Stingrays on October 1, 2012. McNeely was leading the Stingrays in scoring with 44 points in 41 games  in the 2012–13 season, before he was loaned to the Lake Erie Monsters, following a brief stint with the Providence Bruins. McNeely secured a regular checking line role within the Monsters and was signed to an AHL contract for the remainder of the campaign on March 30, 2013. He would complete the season 9 AHL points and 44 ECHL points.

On July 26, 2013, McNeely was recruited to sign a one-year contract as a free agent with DEL2 club Starbulls Rosenheim.

Career statistics

References

External links

1987 births
Living people
Bridgeport Sound Tigers players
Canadian ice hockey left wingers
Lake Erie Monsters players
Northeastern Huskies men's ice hockey players
Providence Bruins players
South Carolina Stingrays players
Starbulls Rosenheim players
Canadian expatriate ice hockey players in Germany
SC Bietigheim-Bissingen players
EC Bad Tölz players
Canadian expatriate ice hockey players in the United States